The Antigua and Barbuda Premier Division, currently known as the Digicel/Red Stripe Premier Division for sponsorship purposes, is the top football league in Antigua and Barbuda excludes Antigua Barracuda.

History
It was created in 1968 and is headed by the Antigua and Barbuda Football Association. 10 teams participate in this league. The winner of the league qualifies for the following year's CFU Club Championship. The 9th and 10th placed teams are relegated to the Antigua and Barbuda First Division.

The championship is usually played between September and March.

Clubs competing in the 2018–19 season

Aston Villa (St. John's)
Five Islands (Five Islands)
Grenades (Jennings)
Hoppers (Greenbay, St. John's)
Liberta (Liberta, Antigua and Barbuda)
Old Road (Old Road)
Parham (Parham)
SAP (Bolans)
Swetes (Swetes)
Tryum (St. John's)

Previous winners

Performance by club

Top scorers

External links
Antigua and Barbuda - List of Champions, RSSSF.com

 
Football leagues in Antigua and Barbuda
Top level football leagues in the Caribbean
Sports leagues established in 1968
1968 establishments in Antigua and Barbuda